The Henri Poincaré Prize is awarded every three years since 1997 for exceptional achievements in mathematical physics and foundational contributions 
leading to new developments in the field. The prize is sponsored by the Daniel Iagolnitzer Foundation and is awarded to approximately three scientists at the International Congress on Mathematical Physics. The prize was also established to support promising young researchers that already made outstanding contributions in mathematical physics.

Prize recipients

See also 

 Henri Poincaré
 List of physics awards
 List of mathematics awards

References

External links 
 Webpage of the prize
 Daniel Iagolnitzer Foundation

Physics awards
Research awards
Mathematical physics
Triennial events